Eduardo Charme Fernández (born 8 October 1954–10 October 1920) was a Chilean politician and physician who served as President of the Senate of Chile.

External links
 BCN Profile

1854 births
1920 deaths
Chilean people
Chilean politicians
Independent Liberal Party (Chile) politicians
University of Chile alumni
Presidents of the Senate of Chile